Nannoparce is a genus of moths in the family Sphingidae. The genus was erected by Walter Rothschild and Karl Jordan in 1903.

Species
Nannoparce balsa Schaus 1932
Nannoparce poeyi (Grote 1865)

References

Sphingini
Moth genera
Taxa named by Walter Rothschild
Taxa named by Karl Jordan